Larry C. Johnson is an American blogger and former analyst at the U.S. Central Intelligence Agency. He is the co-owner and CEO of BERG Associates, LLC (Business Exposure Reduction Group).

Background
Johnson worked at the CIA for four years as an analyst, then moved to the State Department's Office of Counterterrorism. In 1993, Johnson left government work to join the private sector, "going on to build a dual career as a business consultant and a pundit on intelligence issues." He appeared on television programs such as The News Hour and Larry King Live, giving his commentary.

Views and controversies

Early 1990s to 2008
In numerous writings and interviews in the late 1990s and early 2000s, Johnson deemphasized the threat stemming from terrorism. In 1998, he commented on Osama bin Laden, saying that he was possessed by "hatred and craziness." If left unanswered, "he would continue to terrorize Americans around the world. He has no compunction about killing women and children. He's a complete egalitarian in his murderous attitude." In later interviews (1999, 2000), Johnson said Americans exaggerated the threats stemming from bin Laden. In July 2001, two months before the September 11 attacks,  Johnson wrote a New York Times op-ed entitled, "The Declining Terrorist Threat," arguing that "terrorism is not the biggest security challenge confronting the United States, and it should not be portrayed that way."

In 2003, Johnson said that while he did not condone torture, he suggested that a "sleep deprivation and reward system" might be useful for getting information from Khalid Sheikh Mohammed.

In May 2003, Johnson joined members of Veteran Intelligence Professionals for Sanity (VIPS) in condemning the manipulation of intelligence for political purposes.

Johnson became a strong critic of the Bush administration in May 2003 for its conduct of the war in Iraq and, a few months later, for its role in the outing of CIA operative Valerie Plame.  In a July 2006 post at Daily Kos, Johnson harshly criticized ex-CIA analyst Michael Scheuer (calling him, among other things, "a vicious little prick") and called Israel's invasion of Lebanon "stupid."

After Robert Novak wrote a column identifying Valerie Plame Wilson (the wife of former ambassador Joseph C. Wilson) as a CIA operative, the media invited Johnson to comment on the ensuing scandal because he had been a member of the same Career Trainee class as Valerie Plame Wilson. For example, in October 2003, he appeared on Democracy Now! to discuss the Plame affair.  He told interviewer Amy Goodman that Valerie Wilson's cover should have been respected whether she was an "analyst" or a "cleaning lady": "if she's undercover she's undercover, period.  If the media allows themselves to get distracted with those kinds of curve balls, they ignore the issue."

2008 to present

Michelle Obama hoax
Beginning in 2007, Johnson emerged as a strident opponent of Barack Obama's 2008 presidential campaign. His rapid swing from the left to the right earned him the enmity of former allies. According to The New York Times, Johnson is "best known for spreading a hoax... in 2008 that Michelle Obama had been videotaped using a slur against Caucasians". His blog, NoQuarterUSA, often criticized Obama's qualifications to be president. On May 16, 2008, Johnson posted an item entitled, "Will Barack Throw Mama From the Train?" which alleged that a tape existed of Michelle Obama "railing against 'whitey' at Jeremiah Wright's church." Johnson claimed that Republicans were in possession of the tape and it "is being held for the fall to drop at the appropriate time." In a subsequent post, Johnson claimed that Obama's appearance had occurred when she was on a panel with Louis Farrakhan. He also explained that he himself had not seen the tape, but had spoken with "five separate sources who have spoken directly with people who have seen the tape." The Obama campaign's "Fight the Smears" website denied the rumor, saying, "No such tape exists. Michelle Obama has not spoken from the pulpit at Trinity and has not used that word."

No tape was ever released, nor has any other evidence emerged of Obama using the word "whitey". On October 21, 2008, Johnson said that, according to one of his sources, the McCain campaign "intervened and requested the tape not be used."

War crime accusations against John Kerry
In 2013, Johnson falsely accused John Kerry of war crimes in Vietnam, alleging that Kerry had "raped some poor Vietnamese woman."  To support his claim, Johnson used a YouTube video that contained audio clips from a 1971 debate on The Dick Cavett Show between John Kerry and John O'Neill.  The original interview audio was altered to piece together words that Kerry spoke at different times during the debate, falsely making it sound as if he said, "I personally raped for pleasure."  When the falsehood was exposed by a reader of Johnson's blog, Johnson deleted the article without apology.

Allegations that British intelligence wiretapped Donald Trump 
In March 2017, Andrew Napolitano spread the unfounded conspiracy theory that GCHQ, one of Britain's top intelligence agencies, had wiretapped Donald Trump during the 2016 presidential campaign on orders from President Obama. Johnson was the source for Napolitano's claim. The conspiracy theory was later asserted as fact by President Trump, with him citing Fox News and Napolitano. GCHQ responded, stating that the claims were "nonsense, utterly ridiculous and should be ignored". Fox News later disavowed the statement by Napolitano.

Notes

References
Bearden, Milt, and Larry Johnson. "A Glimpse at the Alliances of Terror." The New York Times 7 November 2000: 29.
Iraq and the War on Terror.  Frontline PBS.  Online featured programs.  Accessed 19 November 2006.
Johnson, Larry C..  "The Declining Terrorist Threat." The New York Times 10 July 2001:A19.
–––. "The Myth of Terrorism, Part Deux." No Quarter (personal blog) 2 July 2006, accessed 19 November 2006.
–––.  "Setting the Record Straight on Iraqi Terrorism," posted in Booman Tribune: A Progressive Community (personal blog) 27 January 2003.  Accessed 19 November 2006.
–––.  "Stories by Larry C. Johnson." AlterNet. (Indexed archive with hyperlinks.) Accessed 20 November 2006.
–––. "Vindicated At Last, Thank You General Barr" posted in Sic Semper Tyrannis (blog of W. Patrick Lang) 11 April 2019.
Olbermann, Keith.  "'Countdown with Keith Olbermann' for April 25: Read the transcript to the Tuesday show."  Guests: Larry Johnson, Greg Mitchell, Rick Klein, Jerry Della Femina, Paul Mooney. Countdown with Keith Olbermann MSNBC 25 April 2006.  Transcript posted on MSNBC on 26 April 2006.  Accessed 19 November 2006.
Schmitt, Gary. "Meet Larry Johnson: The CIA official Turned Democratic Spokesman Has a Pre-9/11 Mindset." Daily Standard (blog) 25 July 2005.  Accessed November 20, 2006.
York, Byron.  "NR/Digital: The Media: Mr. Counterterrorism Guru: He Says He’s Not, But Others Say He Is." National Review Online  5 June 2006.  Accessed 19 November 2006.

External links
 
 
 

Year of birth missing (living people)
Living people
Writers from Independence, Missouri
American male bloggers
American bloggers
American anti–Iraq War activists
American political commentators
American political writers
American male writers
American broadcast news analysts
People of the Central Intelligence Agency
People associated with the Plame affair
University of Missouri alumni
21st-century American non-fiction writers